The 2016 presidential campaign of Jeb Bush, the 43rd Governor of Florida, was formally launched on June 15, 2015, coming six months after announcing the formal exploration of a candidacy for the 2016 Republican nomination for the President of the United States on December 16, 2014, and the formation of the Right to Rise PAC. On February 20, 2016, Bush announced his intention to drop out of the presidential race following the South Carolina primary. Had Bush been elected, he would have been the first president from Florida and the first sibling of a U.S. president (George W. Bush) to win the presidency himself.

Bush was not the first sibling of a former president to seek a party's nomination. President John F. Kennedy's brothers Robert and Ted both sought the Democratic nomination. Additionally, a pair of brothers had once-before both received nominations on a major party ticket. William Jennings Bryan was the Democratic nominee for president in 1896, 1900 and 1908. His brother, Charles W. Bryan, was the Democratic nominee for vice-president in 1924.

Bush was assumed by many to be a near lock for the Republican nomination early on, and his candidacy, in which he failed to finish higher than fourth in a single primary election, is widely considered to have been a shocking fiasco.

Background

In 1994, Bush was the Republican nominee for Governor of Florida, losing narrowly to the incumbent Lawton Chiles. Four years later, in 1998, Bush ran again, defeating Lieutenant Governor Buddy MacKay (incumbent Governor Lawton Chiles would die in early December 1998, so although defeating MacKay, Bush succeeded MacKay, who ascended upon Chiles' death). He was reelected in 2002 by a sizeable margin.

The second-born son of George H. W. Bush and younger brother of George W. Bush, the 41st and 43rd Presidents of the United States, respectively, Jeb Bush would have been, had he been elected, the first brother of a President, and his father, George H. W. Bush, would have been the first President to have two sons hold the same office.

There had been speculation that Bush would make a run for President since the end of the 2012 election. Speculation was fueled when he announced he would be "actively exploring" a run for President on December 16, 2014, and resigned from several corporate boards. It was further speculated that Bush had put off formally announcing a candidacy in order to raise unlimited amounts of money for his Right to Rise Super PAC, and prepare strategy; once formally a candidate, one cannot coordinate with PACs or Super PACs under campaign finance law.

Exploration of a candidacy

On December 16, 2014, Bush announced the formation of The Right to Rise PAC, a Super PAC intended to serve as an exploratory committee and fundraising mechanism for a potential candidacy. While not formally a candidate, he was the first potential contender to make any major moves toward the beginning of the 2016 election cycle. Widely seen as the 'establishment' candidate, Bush was expected to court and win donors who were central to the 2012 presidential election on the Republican side. While having repeatedly said he would not run again, 2012 nominee Governor Mitt Romney told donors in early January 2015 that he was seriously considering another run. With early polling showing significant buyer's remorse among many who voted for President Obama in 2012, and showing that he would defeat Hillary Clinton, Romney likely saw it necessary to see if he could tap into his donor base again, to which Bush was the likely successor. After several weeks' consideration, Romney chose against running again, after receiving criticism from many in his own party who wanted a fresher face, and having lost many staff who joined Bush's team before Romney reconsidered. With Romney conclusively out of the race, Bush was seen as the likely front runner for the nomination.

In February 2015, Bush preemptively released his official emails from his time as Governor of Florida, which came with some controversy as personal information, which was soon redacted, was included in the release.

By extending the 'exploration mode' of his 'potential candidacy' to a six-month period (his scheduled announcement one day short of six months after his exploratory phase), Bush used his time to get acquainted with the press, court donors, and prepare strategy. In doing this, he got around several campaign finance laws which limit donations which persons may make to individual's campaigns, and which prohibit Super PACs from directly coordinating with candidates' campaigns. By May 2015, it was roughly estimated that Bush had raised in excess of $100 million for his Right to Rise PAC, which is expected to exceed his challengers in the Republican field. On June 13, 2015, polling showed Jeb Bush to have support of 17.8% of the Republican electorate. No other Republican candidate was even polling in the double digits.

One of the largest issues expected to face Governor Bush was the unpopular image of his brother, President George W. Bush, as well as many who said they did not wish to see a third Bush in the presidency. Governor Bush came out saying "I'm my own man" with regard to his policies and vision, further saying "I love my mom and dad. I love my brother, and people are just going to have to get over that." Governor Bush publicly stated that his brother was his "top foreign policy advisor", having learned from his brother's presidency about "protecting the homeland", and that his brother "kept us safe."

Bush appeared as Bob Schieffer's final interview guest on Face the Nation during his retirement episode.

The Kelly File interview
In an interview with Fox News' Megyn Kelly, which aired on The Kelly File on May 11, 2015, Bush was questioned on a wide variety of topics, including the 2003 invasion of Iraq. Asked by Kelly:

Bush's answer to the question implying whether or not his brother, the President, made a mistake, generated controversy on both Republican and Democratic sides. The following day, in a radio interview with Fox News' Sean Hannity, Bush said "clearly there were mistakes as it related to faulty intelligence in the lead-up to the war and the lack of focus on security;" throughout the remainder of the week, Bush issued various answers on the topic. At a May 13 event in Nevada, Bush further said "...if we're going to get into hypotheticals I think it does a disservice for a lot of people that sacrificed a lot." By the week's end, May 15, Bush backed off his original statements, saying definitively, "knowing what we know now I would not have engaged — I would not have gone into Iraq."

Campaign

Logo
In a branding decision, the Bush campaign unveiled a logo featuring his name with an exclamation mark that conspicuously left out the Bush surname. Although the logo was merely a variation of the campaign logo used since his first race for governor in 1994, it received criticism and was the subject of internet satire due to its use of the exclamation point and "whimsical" font. On a September 2015 episode of The Late Show with Stephen Colbert, Bush defended his campaign logo, saying "I've been using 'Jeb!' since 1994 — it connotes excitement."

Announcement and preliminary campaign

On June 4, the same day as Governor Rick Perry's formal campaign announcement, an anonymous Bush staffer leaked that Bush would formally announce his candidacy on June 15. Bush made a trip to Germany, Poland, and Estonia before returning to begin his campaign. On June 15, 2015, Bush formally announced his candidacy at Miami Dade College's Kendall Campus, in Miami, Florida.

Bush embarked on a tour following his June 15 announcement, with stops in Iowa, New Hampshire, South Carolina, and Nevada. The Bush campaign cancelled events in Charleston, South Carolina, in light of the June 17 mass shooting.

In early August 2015, while speaking at the Southern Baptist Forum in Nashville, Tennessee, Bush questioned the $500 million in federal funding for Planned Parenthood; a line from Bush's speech, "I’m not sure we need half a billion dollars for women’s health issues", garnered criticism and became a talking point at the August 2015 Republican Debate. Bush later said that he "misspoke", and that he meant to say that he would like the funds redirected to other women's health organizations, in line with his record as Governor of Florida; in 2003, Bush redirected $124,000 in funding from Planned Parenthood toward abstinence-only sex education programs.

On August 11, 2015, Bush gave a major foreign policy speech at the Ronald Reagan Presidential Library, outlining his positions on Middle Eastern issues.

"Jeb Can Fix It"
In November 2015, following a lull in poll numbers, Bush kicked off a tour to re-invigorate interest in Florida, South Carolina, and New Hampshire, dubbed the "Jeb Can Fix It" tour. The tour accompanied the release of an e-book titled "Reply All", which consisted of 730 pages of self-selected e-mails that Bush sent and received during his tenure as Governor of Florida.

Tension with Donald Trump
The dynamic between Bush and opponent Donald Trump was one of the more contentious relationships among the Republican contenders. Trump repeatedly mocked Jeb Bush with the epithet that he was "low energy". Trump told CNN "the last thing we need is another Bush" in the White House after the much-criticized presidencies of his father and brother. Trump criticized Bush's elder brother and his role in the Iraq War throughout the Republican debates, leading Bush to defend his brother. During an exchange between Bush and Trump in a February 2016 Republican primary debate, the audience repeatedly booed Trump. Trump scoffed that the audience was made up of "Jeb's special interests and lobbyists".

In August 2015, the Trump campaign released an attack ad against Bush known as the "Act of Love" ad. The advertisement played footage of Bush from a 2014 interview, where he characterized illegal entry into the U.S. by illegal immigrants as "an act of love." The ad showed mugshots of illegal immigrants who committed violent crimes in the U.S. interspersed with footage of Bush saying, "Yeah, they broke the law, but it's not a felony.... It's an act of love." During the August 6, 2015 Republican Presidential debate, Bush defended his "act of love" statement, saying, "I believe that the great majority of people coming here illegally have no other option. They want to provide for their family." He added that "there should be a path to earned legal status" for illegal immigrants.

According to The Washington Post, the most telling aspect of the Bush–Trump duel may have been the fact that, "No candidate in the race was prepared for GOP voters' opposition to immigration, with the exception of Trump". Conservative political analyst Michael Barone pointed to Trump's two-pronged attack on Bush in the August Republican primary debate, for the "act of love" position on illegal immigration and for being weak, as a key moment in Trump's political rise.

As a result of his attacks at the hands of Trump, Bush's support among Republicans had fallen to 3% by early December. His campaign largely ignored the Trump's attacks for most of the campaign, likely believing that Trump's campaign would eventually fall apart without Jeb needing to attack him. Although Bush began to more directly campaign against Trump in January and February 2016, his campaign had already stalled beyond resuscitation.

Trump also attacked Bush for his brother's handing of the September 11 attacks, saying in a 2015 debate, "I lost hundreds of friends in those attacks. Bush had the opportunity to kill Osama Bin Laden and he didn't" in response to Marco Rubio saying, "I am glad it was George W. Bush in the White House on 9/11 and not Al Gore."

"Please Clap"
In February 2016, at a town hall event in Hanover, New Hampshire following the Iowa Caucus, Bush's call for the country to elect a strong commander-in-chief was met with silence from the audience; in response, Bush said to the audience "Please clap." A video clip of the incident went viral and was noted as a symbol of his campaign's sagging popularity.

Suspension of campaign
After a series of poor results in Iowa and New Hampshire, Bush spent his remaining money and campaign effort on the South Carolina primary. He placed fourth with under 8% of the vote. That night, Bush suspended his campaign, ending his presidential bid. In an analysis of what went wrong, POLITICO argues that:

His slow, awkward stumble from August through October encapsulates everything that caused the operation viewed as "Jeb!, Inc." to fail. Bush was on the wrong side of the most galvanizing issues for Republican primary voters, he himself was a rusty and maladroit campaigner and his campaign was riven by internal disagreements and a crippling fear that left them paralyzed and unable to react to Trump.

Fundraising
On July 9, 2015, at a campaign fund-raising conference in the Bush family compound in Kennebunkport, Maine, Bush announced that super PACs which support his candidacy, mainly Right to Rise, had received a total of $103 million during the previous six months. The campaign itself had received $11.4 million, $700,000 a day, during its first two weeks.

Policy positions

Endorsements

U.S. Presidents and First Ladies (former)

U.S. Vice Presidents (former)
 Dan Quayle, 44th Vice President (1989–1993)

Executive branch officials (former)

U.S. Governors (former)

U.S. Senators (current and former)

U.S. Representatives (current and former)

U.S. Ambassadors (former)

Republican National Committee members (former)

Statewide officials

State legislators

Mayors and other municipal leaders

International Politicians
 Ulf Leirstein, Norwegian MP (Progress Party)

Businesspeople

Newspapers

Celebrities, commentators, and activists

See also
 Republican Party presidential candidates, 2016
 Act of Love (advertisement)
 Laudato si' § Impact on the United States political system

References

Bush, Jeb
Jeb Bush
Internet memes